The Dallara T12 or Dallara FR35-12 is a racing car developed by Italian manufacturer Dallara for use in the World Series Formula V8 3.5, a series originally formed from the World Series by Renault top category. The T12 is the third generation of car used by the World Series by Renault/WS Formula V8 3.5, and was introduced at Silverstone on August 24, 2011.

The T12 chassis featured a new,  V8 engine supplied by British firm Zytek Motorsport and designated as ZRS03. The car also featured a new gearbox developed by Ricardo and a Drag Reduction System similar to the one first used in the 2011 Formula One season. As the WS Formula V8 3.5 is a spec series, the T12 is raced by every team and driver on the grid.

References

External links
Dallara T12 Formula Renault 3.5 Technical Specifications
Dallara Official Website

World Series Formula V8 3.5
Open wheel racing cars
T12